The Florida International University College of Law is the law school of Florida International University, located in Miami, Florida in the United States. The law school is accredited by the American Bar Association, and is the only public law school in South Florida.

History 

Florida International University worked towards the creation of a public law school in South Florida for many years, beginning with the 1986 appointment of Modesto A. Maidique as University president. Maidique met resistance from the Florida Board of Regents, which had a number of graduates of other Florida law schools, and opposed the opening of any new public law schools in the state.  The establishment of this institution was finally realized in 2000, when Governor Jeb Bush pushed the project through the state legislature, along with the re-establishment of a law school at Florida A&M University.

Shortly thereafter, the College of Law hired Leonard Strickman as its inaugural Dean.  Strickman, a Yale Law School graduate, had previously served as Dean of the Northern Illinois University College of Law and the University of Arkansas School of Law, and had been a member of the ABA Accreditation Committee during the 1990s, and had chaired 15 ABA accreditation site visits.

The College of Law is one of the university's 26 schools and colleges and was founded in 2000. It officially opened its doors in August 2002, received provisional accreditation from the American Bar Association in August 2004, and was granted full accreditation on December 1, 2006. The inaugural class graduated on May 22, 2005.

FIU, preparing for only its second graduation in Spring 2006, had passing scores from 19 of 22 students who took the Bar exam in February 2006. The state average — including graduates from all 10 Florida law schools and out-of-state graduates who took the Florida test — was 73.2 percent.

On February 10, 2007, the new law school building, the Rafael Diaz-Balart Hall, was dedicated.

In May 2009, the institution announced that United States Attorney Alexander Acosta had been selected to replace Strickman as Dean, with the latter's retirement from the position.  Acosta left in 2017 to become United States Secretary of Labor.

Rankings
The 2020 U.S. News & World Reports "Best Law School Rankings" ranked the FIU College of Law at 91 in the United States.

FIU is currently the fourth highest-ranked law school in Florida behind only Florida State University College of Law, University of Florida's Fredric G. Levin College of Law, and the University of Miami School of Law.  The magazine also ranked FIU at 37 in the U.S. for its part-time law programs.

In October 2010, the FIU College of Law was ranked Top 10 Best Value school in the nation by The National Jurist.

FIU Law graduates passed the February 2007 Florida bar exam with a 94 percent passing rate, the highest in the state of Florida.

In March 2007, the FIU College of Law received its first national ranking in U.S. News & World Report. FIU was ranked in the third tier of the four tiers of law school.

Employment 
According to FIU's official 2018 ABA-required disclosures, 74.7% of the Class of 2018 obtained full-time, long-term, JD-required employment ten months after graduation. FIU's Law School Transparency under-employment score was 14.01%, indicating the percentage of the Class of 2018 unemployed, pursuing an additional degree, or working in a non-professional, short-term, or part-time job ten months after graduation.

Exam passage
FIU Law graduates ranked first in the state of Florida, in terms of percentage of students who pass the Florida bar exam on their first attempt, eleven times in the school's history, including seven of the last eight administrations (July 2015, February 2016, July 2016, July 2017, February 2018, July 2018, and February 2019).

FIU also ranked first in Florida in the Multistate Professional Responsibility Exam (MPRE) with a 95.5% passage rate in 2007.

Admissions and tuition
This table does not account deferred applications or other unique situations.

The College of Law only admits students during the fall to its full-time day program or its part-time evening program. Admissions is done on a rolling basis.

For Fall 2016, 1,901 students applied for admissions into the FIU College of Law, 545 were accepted, and 130 enrolled for the day program and 16 for the evening program.  The Fall 2016 entering class had a median LSAT score of 156 (out of a possible 180 points) and a 3.64 GPA (on a 4.0 scale). 62.9% of students were ethnic minorities, and 52% were women. The average age is 25 for the day program and 28 for the evening program.

Annual tuition for in-state students in the day program is $21,407 and $14,501  for those in the evening program. Annual tuition for out-of-state students in the day program is $35,650 and $24,150 for those in the evening program.

Specialty programs

Specialty programs
International and Comparative Law Program
Legal Skills and Values Board
Moot Court Board of Appellate Advocates 
Community Service Board
Trial Advocacy Program
Intellectual Property Certificate
Environmental & Natural Resources Law Certificate

Faculty and administration

Administration
 Antony Page, Dean (after R. Alexander Acosta was appointed by President Donald Trump to serve as United States Secretary of Labor).

Faculty
The FIU College of Law has about 30 full-time faculty members (including the Dean and the Associate Dean for Academics, both of whom teach on an occasional basis), and also has various visiting professors who teach subjects within their areas of expertise.

Founding faculty
The founding faculty are the professors who came to the University before it was opened to students. They included:

 Thomas E. Baker, professor of Constitutional law
 Jorge Esquirol, professor of International law, who had previously been Director of Academic Affairs in the Harvard Law School Graduate Program.
 Elizabeth Price Foley, professor of Civil procedure and Constitutional law.
 Aya Gruber, professor of Criminal law, who had assisted Alan Dershowitz during the O. J. Simpson case before becoming a public defender in Washington, D.C.
 Mathew C. Mirow, professor of Property law and legal historian
 Ediberto Roman, professor of Contract law, and author of numerous articles and a book on the disenfranchisement of residents of the United States' inhabited Insular possessions
 Scott F. Norberg, professor of Bankruptcy and Contracts

In addition, Professor John Stack already a long-time professor of political science at FIU before the foundation of the law school, and director of the Jack D. Gordon Public Policy Institute, became a jointly-appointed faculty member in the College of Law and the Political Science department.

Notable faculty

Stanley Fish was hired to a five-year contract, as the Davidson-Kahn Distinguished University Professor of Humanities and Law in June 2005.
Jerry W. Markham wrote textbooks on various topics, and one of the most thorough and extensive treatises on the history of securities regulation, before coming to FIU.  He teaches in the areas of business organizations, banking, securities, international litigation, and international business transactions.
Henry Latimer, also a visiting professor who taught Alternative Dispute Resolution, was formerly a judge, and was in line to become the first African-American president of the Florida Bar Association when he was killed in a car accident in spring 2005.

Notable adjunct faculty
Judge Adalberto Jordan of the United States Court of Appeals for the Eleventh Circuit
Judge Robert N. Scola Jr. of the United States District Court for the Southern District of Florida
Larry R Leiby teaches construction law and commercial arbitration.

Students 

The Florida International University College of Law opened with a class of 67 full-time and 60 part-time students. LSAT and GPA scores placed the inaugural class around the middle of Florida's 11 law schools. The first graduate was Rosann Spiegel, also a previous FIU alumnus, who finished the program a semester ahead of schedule. Spiegel graduated in December 2004 and passed the February 2005 bar examination - briefly making FIU the only law school in the country with a 100% bar passage rate.

In January 2010, FIU College of Law students placed first among the Southeastern States Regional American Bar Association negotiation competition. Students also placed second in the Zehmer Mock Trial Competition and second on the brief at the Skadden Arps International FDI moot competition.

The student body has also formed two Law Reviews and a Moot Court team, as well as a Student Bar Association and other student organizations, such as a chapter of the Federalist Society, a student newspaper called "Ipsissima Verba", and a Sports and Entertainment Law Society (SELS). Currently, the institution has about 450 students, including part-time and full-time first, second, and third year students. Eventually, the school is projected to have a capacity of about 600 students at a time.

Law journals

FIU Law Review 
Established in 2004, the FIU Law Review is the law school's official student law review. The FIU Law Review is committed to facilitate FIU Law's growth and impact in the legal community.

The Review organizes two symposia and publishes two symposium-based issues annually (Fall and Spring). Articles Editors and Staff Members also write about current changes in the law on the Law Review’s blog.

Symposium topics include:

 Immigration Law (Spring 2011)
 Layers of Law and Social Order (Fall 2014).
 Aviation and Space Law (Spring 2015).
 Religion and the Law (Fall 2015). 
 Separation of powers (Spring, 2016).

FIU World Arbitration and Mediation Review 
The FIU World Arbitration and Mediation Review ("WAMR") was established to provide a contemporary resource for arbitrators and mediators.

Curriculum 
The FIU College of Law is unique among American law schools in that it requires all students to take a course entitled An Introduction to International and Comparative Law during their first year.  Other required first year courses are more typical - Constitutional law, Torts, and Contracts in the first semester, Criminal law, Civil Procedure, and Property in the second, and legal writing classes (called Legal Skills and Values, or simply LSV) throughout. However, each of the substantive classes also dedicates a portion of its discussion to international and comparative issues in that area of law.

Upper level requirements also include an additional course relating to international law, an additional LSV class, a writing seminar, and a course in Professional Responsibility.

Clinical programs 

The FIU College of Law offers six in-house clinics:

The Carlos A. Costa Immigration and Human Rights Clinic
The Community Development Clinic
Consumer Bankruptcy Clinic
Family Law and Education Advocacy Clinic
The H.E.L.P. (Health, Ethics, Law and Policy) Clinic, and the Education Advocacy Clinic.
The Immigrant Children's Justice Clinic
The Investor Advocacy Clinic

Facilities 

The Florida International University College of Law operates out of the Rafael Díaz-Ballart Hall, designed by architect Robert A. M. Stern. A groundbreaking ceremony was held for the law school's building on May 22, 2005 (the same day as the inaugural commencement). $34 million was budgeted for the construction of the facility. The new building is also on the University Park campus, across from the FIU Arena and adjacent to the Recreation Center and a 1,000-car parking garage.

On-campus housing is available for graduate students in the College of Law at the University Park Towers and the University Park Apartments through the graduate housing community.

References

External links 
 

Law, College of
ABA-accredited law schools in Florida
Educational institutions established in 2000
2000 establishments in Florida